The following is a list of the people who have served as head of the Ministry of Justice of Quebec, or as Attorneys-General of Quebec, Canada East and Lower Canada. Prior to 1965, the name of the position was "Attorney General for Quebec".  In 1965, the name of the position was changed to the "Minister of Justice", who is ex officio the Attorney General for Quebec.

List of Ministers of Justice
 Simon Jolin-Barrette (June 22, 2020 – present)
 Sonia LeBel (October 18, 2018 – June 22, 2020)
 Stéphanie Vallée (April 23, 2014 – October 18, 2018)
 Bertrand St-Arnaud (September 19, 2012 – April 23, 2014)
 Jean-Marc Fournier (August 11, 2010 – September 19, 2012)
 Kathleen Weil (December 18, 2008 – August 11, 2010)
 Jacques P. Dupuis (April 18, 2007 – December 18, 2008)
 Yvon Marcoux (February 18, 2005 – April 18, 2007)
 Jacques P. Dupuis (April 27, 2004 – February 18, 2005)
 Marc Bellemare (April 29, 2003 – April 27, 2004)
 Normand Jutras (October 29, 2002 – April 29, 2003)
 Paul Bégin (March 8, 2001 – October 28, 2002)
 Linda Goupil (December 15, 1998 – March 8, 2001)
 Serge Ménard (August 25, 1997 – December 15, 1998)
 Paul Bégin (September 26, 1994 – August 25, 1997)
 Roger Lefebvre (January 11, 1994 – September 26, 1994)
 Gil Rémillard (June 23, 1988 – January 11, 1994)
 Herbert Marx (December 12, 1985 – June 23, 1988)
 Raynald Fréchette (October 3, 1985 – December 12, 1985)
 Pierre-Marc Johnson (March 5, 1984 – October 3, 1985)
 Marc-André Bédard (November 26, 1976 – March 5, 1984)
 Gérard D. Levesque (July 30, 1975 – November 26, 1976)
 Jérôme Choquette (May 12, 1970 – July 30, 1975)
 Rémi Paul (July 23, 1969 – May 12, 1970)
 Jean-Jacques Bertrand (June 16, 1966 – July 23, 1969)
 Claude Wagner (June 4, 1965 – June 16, 1966)

List of attorneys-general of Quebec (Procureur Général du Québec)

Prior to 1965, the senior justice official in the province was the Attorney General. This role was created in 1867 replacing the role of Attorney General of Canada East and before 1841 the Attorney General of Lower Canada.

 Gédéon Ouimet 1867–1873
 George Irvine 1873–1874
 Levi Ruggles Church 1874–1876
 Auguste-Réal Angers 1876–1878
 David Alexander Ross 1878–1879
 Louis-Onésime Loranger 1879–1882
 Joseph-Alfred Mousseau 1882–1884
 Louis-Olivier Taillon 1884–1887
 Honoré Mercier 1887–1888
 Arthur Turcotte 1888–1890
 Joseph-Emery Robidoux 1890–1891
 Thomas Chase Casgrain 1891–1892, 1892–1896
 Edmund James Flynn 1892
 Louis-Philippe Pelletier 1896–1897
 Sir François-Xavier-Horace Archambeault 1897–1905
 Lomer Gouin 1905–1919
 Louis-Alexandre Taschereau 1919–1936
 Joseph-Edouard Perrault 1936
 Charles-Auguste Bertrand 1936
 Maurice Duplessis 1936–1939
 Wilfrid Girouard 1939–1942
 Léon Casgrain 1942–1944
 Maurice Duplessis 1944–1959
 Antoine Rivard 1959–1960
 Georges-Émile Lapalme 1960–1963
 René Hamel 1963–1964
 Claude Wagner 1964–1965

List of attorneys-general of Canada East (Procureur Général du Canada-Est) 1841–1867

 Louis-Hippolyte Lafontaine 1842–1843
 James Smith 1844–1847
 William Badgley 1847–1848
 Louis-Hippolyte Lafontaine 1848–1851
 Lewis Thomas Drummond 1851–1856
 Sir George-Étienne Cartier 1856–1862
 Sir Antoine-Aimé Dorion 1863–1864
 Sir George-Étienne Cartier 1864–1867

List of attorneys-general of Lower Canada (Procureur Général du Bas-Canada) 1791–1841

 James Stuart 1825–1832
 Charles Richard Ogden 1833–1840
Edward Bowen 1808–1809, 1810–1812 (acting AG)
 Jonathan Sewell 1791–1793
James Monk 1776–1789, 1792–1794
 Jonathan Sewell 1795–1808

See also
 Ministry of Justice (Quebec)
 Directeur des poursuites criminelles et pénales

References

Quebec